Lady Boss: The Jackie Collins Story is a 2021 American-British documentary film, directed by Laura Fairrie. It follows the life and career of Jackie Collins.

It had its world premiere at the Tribeca Film Festival on June 10, 2021.

Synopsis
It follows the life and career of Jackie Collins.

Production
In August 2019, it was announced Laura Fairrie would direct a documentary film revolving around the life of Jackie Collins, with CNN Films and BBC Arts producing, with CNN set to distribute in the United States.

Release
It had its world premiere at the Tribeca Film Festival on June 10, 2021. Prior to, Modern Films acquired U.K. distribution rights to the film, and set it for a July 2, 2021, release. It was released in the United States on June 27, 2021.

Reception
Lady Boss: The Jackie Collins Story received positive reviews from film critics. It holds a 100% approval rating on review aggregator website Rotten Tomatoes, based on 16 reviews, with a weighted average of 7.40/10. The site's critical consensus reads, "Helmed with the same frothy glamor as its subject's novels, Lady Boss is a joyous retrospective of Jackie Collins and a persuasive reappraisal of her literary contributions." On Metacritic, the film holds a rating of 70 out of 100, based on 6 critics, indicating "generally favorable reviews".

References

External links
 
 
 

2021 films
2021 documentary films
American documentary films
British documentary films
CNN Films films
2020s English-language films
2020s American films
2020s British films